The men's light bantamweight (51 kg/112.2 lbs) Low-Kick division at the W.A.K.O. European Championships 2006 in Skopje was the lightest of the male Low-Kick tournaments and was one of the smallest involving just four fighters.  Each of the matches was three rounds of two minutes each and were fought under Low-Kick kickboxing rules.

The tournament gold medal was won by Russian Aleksandar Aleksandrov who defeated Azerbaijan's Nijat Huseynov in the final by split decision.  The bronze medal positions were occupied by defeated semi finalists, Rasim Aliti from hosts Macedonia and Afanasiev Klimeni from Russia.

Results

Key

See also
List of WAKO Amateur European Championships
List of WAKO Amateur World Championships
List of male kickboxers

References

External links
 WAKO World Association of Kickboxing Organizations Official Site

W.A.K.O. European Championships 2006 (Skopje)